Catani was a railway station on the Strzelecki line in South Gippsland, Victoria, Australia. The station was opened on 29 June 1922, and closed on 15 April 1950 along with Yannathan station, when the line was truncated to Bayles station leaving it the only remaining station on the Strzelecki line until it too was closed on 4 February 1959.

Station facilities
Upon opening of the line in 1922 Catani station was supplied with goods loading and storage facilities, sheep hurdles, departmental residence and passenger facilities.

Disused railway stations in Victoria (Australia)